= Trinnov Audio =

French audio technology company

Trinnov Audio is a French audio technology company founded in 2003. It manufactures digital signal processing equipment used in professional studio monitoring, commercial cinema, and residential multichannel audio systems.

== History ==
Trinnov Audio was founded in France in 2003. Early development focused on three-dimensional acoustic measurement and digital signal processing.

In the mid-2000s, representatives of the company presented research at conventions of the Audio Engineering Society (AES), including papers addressing multichannel sound reproduction and compensation for non-standard speaker layouts.

French business press has reported on the company’s development, including funding activity and expansion initiatives.

== Technology ==
Trinnov Audio develops digital signal processing systems designed to measure and optimize loudspeaker and room interactions. Professional audio publications have reviewed the company’s optimization systems in monitoring and room correction contexts.

Trade publications have reported on the introduction of a low-frequency optimization system referred to as “WaveForming.”

== Products ==
Trinnov manufactures audio processors for professional and residential multichannel systems, including monitoring controllers and multichannel processors.

== Recognition ==
The company’s products have been listed among recipients of awards from the European Imaging and Sound Association (EISA).
